The 1976 North Bedfordshire Borough Council election took place on 6 May 1976 to elect members of North Bedfordshire Borough Council in England. This was on the same day as other local elections.

At the election, the Conservatives gained control of the council from No overall control.

Summary

Election result

|}

References

Bedford
Bedford Borough Council elections
1970s in Bedfordshire